The theory of multiple intelligences proposes the differentiation of human intelligence into specific modalities of intelligence, rather than defining intelligence as a single, general ability. The theory has been criticized by mainstream psychology for its lack of empirical evidence, and its dependence on subjective judgement.

Separation criteria
According to the theory, an intelligence 'modality' must fulfill eight criteria:
 potential for brain isolation by brain damage
 place in evolutionary history
 presence of core operations
 susceptibility to encoding (symbolic expression)
 a distinct developmental progression
 the existence of savants, prodigies and other exceptional people
 support from experimental psychology
 support from psychometric findings

Intelligence modalities
In Frames of Mind: The Theory of Multiple Intelligences (1983) and its sequels, Howard Gardner proposed eight abilities that manifest multiple intelligences.

Musical-rhythmic and harmonic 

This area of intelligence with sensitivity to the sounds, rhythms, and tones of music. People with musical intelligence normally have good pitch or might possess  absolute pitch, and are able to sing, play musical instruments, and compose music. They have sensitivity to rhythm, pitch, meter, tone, melody or timbre.

Visual-spatial 

This area deals with spatial judgment and the ability to visualize with the mind's eye. Spatial ability is one of the three factors beneath g in the hierarchical model of intelligence.

Linguistic-verbal 

People with high verbal-linguistic intelligence display a facility with words and languages. They are typically good at reading, writing, telling stories and memorizing words along with dates. Verbal ability is one of the most g-loaded abilities.
This type of intelligence is measured with the Verbal IQ in WAIS-IV.

Logical-mathematical 

This area has to do with logic, abstractions, reasoning, numbers and critical thinking. This also has to do with having the capacity to understand the underlying principles of some kind of causal system. Logical reasoning is closely linked to fluid intelligence and to general intelligence (g factor).

Bodily-kinesthetic

The core elements of the bodily-kinesthetic intelligence are control of one's bodily motions and the capacity to handle objects skillfully. Gardner elaborates to say that this also includes a sense of timing, a clear sense of the goal of a physical action, along with the ability to train responses.

People who have high bodily-kinesthetic intelligence should be generally good at physical activities such as sports, dance and making things.

Gardner believes that careers that suit those with high bodily-kinesthetic intelligence include: athletes, dancers, musicians, actors, builders, police officers, and soldiers. Although these careers can be duplicated through virtual simulation, they will not produce the actual physical learning that is needed in this intelligence.

Interpersonal 

In theory, individuals who have high interpersonal intelligence are characterized by their sensitivity to others' moods, feelings, temperaments, motivations, and their ability to cooperate to work as part of a group. According to Gardner in How Are Kids Smart: Multiple Intelligences in the Classroom, "Inter- and Intra- personal intelligence is often misunderstood with being extroverted or liking other people". Those with high interpersonal intelligence communicate effectively and empathize easily with others, and may be either leaders or followers. They often enjoy discussion and debate." Gardner has equated this with emotional intelligence of Goleman.

Gardner believes that careers that suit those with high interpersonal intelligence include sales persons, politicians, managers, teachers, lecturers, counselors and social workers.

Intrapersonal 

This area has to do with introspective and self-reflective capacities. This refers to having a deep understanding of the self; what one's strengths or weaknesses are, what makes one unique, being able to predict one's own reactions or emotions.

Naturalistic 
Not part of Gardner's original seven, naturalistic intelligence was proposed by him in 1995. "If I were to rewrite Frames of Mind today, I would probably add an eighth intelligence – the intelligence of the naturalist. It seems to me that the individual who is readily able to recognize flora and fauna, to make other consequential distinctions in the natural world, and to use this ability productively (in hunting, in farming, in biological science) is exercising an important intelligence and one that is not adequately encompassed in the current list." This area has to do with nurturing and relating information to one's natural surroundings. Examples include classifying natural forms such as animal and plant species and rocks and mountain types. This ability was clearly of value in our evolutionary past as hunters, gatherers, and farmers; it continues to be central in such roles as botanist or chef.

This sort of ecological receptiveness is deeply rooted in a "sensitive, ethical, and holistic understanding" of the world and its complexities – including the role of humanity within the greater ecosphere.

Existential 

Gardner did not want to commit to a spiritual intelligence, but suggested that an "existential" intelligence may be a useful construct, also proposed after the original eight in his 1999 book. The hypothesis of an existential intelligence has been further explored by educational researchers.

Additional intelligences 
In January 2016, Gardner mentioned in an interview with Big Think that he was considering adding the teaching–pedagogical intelligence "which allows us to be able to teach successfully to other people". In the same interview, he explicitly refused some other suggested intelligences like humour, cooking and sexual intelligence. Professor Nan B. Adams argues that based on Gardner's definition of multiple intelligences, digital intelligence – a meta-intelligence composed of many other identified intelligences and stemmed from human interactions with digital computers – now exists.

Physical intelligence 

Physical intelligence, also known as bodily-kinesthetic intelligence, is any intelligence derived through physical and practiced learning such as sports, dance, or craftsmanship. It may refer to the ability to use one's hands to create, to express oneself with one's body, a reliance on tactile mechanisms and movement, and accuracy in controlling body movement. An individual with high physical intelligence is someone who is adept at using their physical body to solve problems and express ideas and emotions. The ability to control the physical body and the mind-body connection is part of a much broader range of human potential as set out in Howard Gardner's Theory of multiple intelligences.

Characteristics 

Exhibiting well developed bodily kinesthetic intelligence will be reflected in a person's movements and how they use their physical body.  Often people with high physical intelligence will have excellent hand-eye coordination and be very agile; they are precise and accurate in movement and can express themselves using their body. Gardner referred to the idea of natural skill and innate physical intelligence within his discussion of the autobiographical story of Babe Ruth – a legendary baseball player who, at 15, felt that he has been 'born' on the pitcher's mound.  Individuals with a high body-kinesthetic, or physical intelligence, are likely to be successful in physical careers, including athletes, dancers, musicians, police officers, and soldiers.

Theory 
Developmental psychologist Howard Gardner outlined nine types of intelligence, including spatial intelligence and linguistic intelligence among others.  His seminal work, Frame of Mind, was published in 1983 and was influenced by the works of Alfred Binet and the German psychologist William Stern, who originally coined the term 'Intelligence quotient' (IQ).  Within his paradigm of intelligence, Gardner defines it as "the ability to learn" or "to solve problems," referring to intelligence as a "bio-psychological potential to process information".

Gardner suggested that each individual may possess all of the various forms of intelligence to some extent, but that there is always a dominant, or primary, form. Gardner granted each of the different forms of intelligence equal importance, and he proposed that they have the potential to be nurtured and so strengthened, or ignored and weakened. There have been various critiques of Gardner's work, however, predominantly due to the lack of empirical evidence used to support his thinking.  Furthermore, some have suggested that the 'intelligences' refer to talents, personality, or ability rather than a distinct form of intelligence.

Impact on education
Within his Theory of Multiple Intelligences, Gardner stated that our "educational system is heavily biased towards linguistic modes of intersection and assessment and, to a somewhat lesser degree, toward logical quantities modes as well".  His work went on to shape educational pedagogy and influence relevant policy and legislation across the world; with particular reference to how teachers must assess students' progress to establish the most effective teaching methods for the individual learner.  Gardner's research into the field of learning regarding bodily kinesthetic intelligence has resulted in the use of activities that require physical movement and exertion, with students exhibiting a high level of physical intelligence reporting to benefit from 'learning through movement' in the classroom environment.

Although the distinction between intelligences has been set out in great detail, Gardner opposes the idea of labelling learners to a specific intelligence. Gardner maintains that his theory should "empower learners", not restrict them to one modality of learning. According to Gardner, an intelligence is "a biopsychological potential to process information that can be activated in a cultural setting to solve problems or create products that are of value in a culture." According to a 2006 study, each of the domains proposed by Gardner involves a blend of the general g factor, cognitive abilities other than g, and, in some cases, non-cognitive abilities or personality characteristics.

Critical reception 
Gardner argues that there is a wide range of cognitive abilities, but that there are only very weak correlations among them. For example, the theory postulates that a child who learns to multiply easily is not necessarily more intelligent than a child who has more difficulty on this task. The child who takes more time to master multiplication may best learn to multiply through a different approach, may excel in a field outside mathematics, or may be looking at and understanding the multiplication process at a fundamentally deeper level.

Intelligence tests and psychometrics have generally found high correlations between different aspects of intelligence, rather than the low correlations which Gardner's theory predicts, supporting the prevailing theory of general intelligence rather than multiple intelligences (MI). The theory has been criticized by mainstream psychology for its lack of empirical evidence, and its dependence on subjective judgement.

Definition of intelligence 
A major criticism of the theory is that it is ad hoc: that Gardner is not expanding the definition of the word "intelligence", but rather denies the existence of intelligence as traditionally understood, and instead uses the word "intelligence" where other people have traditionally used words like "ability" and "aptitude". This practice has been criticized by Robert J. Sternberg, Eysenck, and Scarr. White (2006) points out that Gardner's selection and application of criteria for his "intelligences" is subjective and arbitrary, and that a different researcher would likely have come up with different criteria.

Defenders of MI theory argue that the traditional definition of intelligence is too narrow, and thus a broader definition more accurately reflects the differing ways in which humans think and learn.

Some criticisms arise from the fact that Gardner has not provided a test of his multiple intelligences. He originally defined it as the ability to solve problems that have value in at least one culture, or as something that a student is interested in. He then added a disclaimer that he has no fixed definition, and his classification is more of an artistic judgment than fact:

Generally, linguistic and logical-mathematical abilities are called intelligence, but artistic, musical, athletic, etc. abilities are not. Gardner argues this causes the former to be needlessly aggrandized. Certain critics are wary of this widening of the definition, saying that it ignores "the connotation of intelligence ... [which] has always connoted the kind of thinking skills that makes one successful in school."

Gardner writes "I balk at the unwarranted assumption that certain human abilities can be arbitrarily singled out as intelligence while others cannot." Critics hold that given this statement, any interest or ability can be redefined as "intelligence". Thus, studying intelligence becomes difficult, because it diffuses into the broader concept of ability or talent. Gardner's addition of the naturalistic intelligence and conceptions of the existential and moral intelligence are seen as the fruits of this diffusion. Defenders of the MI theory would argue that this is simply a recognition of the broad scope of inherent mental abilities and that such an exhaustive scope by nature defies a one-dimensional classification such as an IQ value.

The theory and definitions have been critiqued by Perry D. Klein as being so unclear as to be tautologous and thus unfalsifiable. Having a high musical ability means being good at music while at the same time being good at music is explained by having high musical ability.

Henri Wallon argues that "We can not distinguish intelligence from its operations". Yves Richez distinguishes 10 Natural Operating Modes (Modes Opératoires Naturels – MoON). Richez's studies are premised on a gap between Chinese thought and Western thought. In China, the notion of "being" (self) and the notion of "intelligence" don't exist. These are claimed to be Graeco-Roman inventions derived from Plato. Instead of intelligence, Chinese refers to "operating modes", which is why Yves Richez does not speak of "intelligence" but of "natural operating modes" (MoON).

Neo-Piagetian criticism 
Andreas Demetriou suggests that theories which overemphasize the autonomy of the domains are as simplistic as the theories that overemphasize the role of general intelligence and ignore the domains. He agrees with Gardner that there are indeed domains of intelligence that are relevantly autonomous of each other. Some of the domains, such as verbal, spatial, mathematical, and social intelligence are identified by most lines of research in psychology. In Demetriou's theory, one of the neo-Piagetian theories of cognitive development, Gardner is criticized for underestimating the effects exerted on the various domains of intelligences by the various subprocesses that define overall processing efficiency, such as speed of processing, executive functions, working memory, and meta-cognitive processes underlying self-awareness and self-regulation. All of these processes are integral components of general intelligence that regulate the functioning and development of different domains of intelligence.

The domains are to a large extent expressions of the condition of the general processes, and may vary because of their constitutional differences but also differences in individual preferences and inclinations. Their functioning both channels and influences the operation of the general processes. Thus, one cannot satisfactorily specify the intelligence of an individual or design effective intervention programs unless both the general processes and the domains of interest are evaluated.

Human adaptation to multiple environments 
The premise of the multiple intelligences hypothesis, that human intelligence is a collection of specialist abilities, have been criticized for not being able to explain human adaptation to most if not all environments in the world. In this context, humans are contrasted to social insects that indeed have a distributed "intelligence" of specialists, and such insects may spread to climates resembling that of their origin but the same species never adapt to a wide range of climates from tropical to temperate by building different types of nests and learning what is edible and what is poisonous. While some such as the leafcutter ant grow fungi on leaves, they do not cultivate different species in different environments with different farming techniques as human agriculture does. It is therefore argued that human adaptability stems from a general ability to falsify hypotheses and make more generally accurate predictions and adapt behavior thereafter, and not a set of specialized abilities which would only work under specific environmental conditions.

IQ tests 
Gardner argues that IQ tests only measure linguistic and logical-mathematical abilities. He argues the importance of assessing in an "intelligence-fair" manner. While traditional paper-and-pen examinations favor linguistic and logical skills, there is a need for intelligence-fair measures that value the distinct modalities of thinking and learning that uniquely define each intelligence.

Psychologist Alan S. Kaufman points out that IQ tests have measured spatial abilities for 70 years. Modern IQ tests are greatly influenced by the Cattell–Horn–Carroll theory which incorporates a general intelligence but also many more narrow abilities. While IQ tests do give an overall IQ score, they now also give scores for many more narrow abilities.

Lack of empirical evidence 
Many of Gardner's "intelligences" correlate with the g factor, supporting the idea of a single dominant type of intelligence. Each of the domains proposed by Gardner involved a blend of g, of cognitive abilities other than g, and, in some cases, of non-cognitive abilities or of personality characteristics.

The Johnson O'Connor Research Foundation has tested hundreds of thousands of people to determine their "aptitudes" ("intelligences"), such as manual dexterity, musical ability, spatial visualization, and memory for numbers. There is correlation of these aptitudes with the g factor, but not all are strongly correlated; correlation between the g factor and "inductive speed" ("quickness in seeing relationships among separate facts, ideas, or observations") is only 0.5, considered a moderate correlation.

Linda Gottfredson (2006) has argued that thousands of studies support the importance of intelligence quotient (IQ) in predicting school and job performance, and numerous other life outcomes. In contrast, empirical support for non-g intelligences is either lacking or very poor. She argued that despite this, the ideas of multiple non-g intelligences are very attractive to many due to the suggestion that everyone can be smart in some way.

A critical review of MI theory argues that there is little empirical evidence to support it:

The same review presents evidence to demonstrate that cognitive neuroscience research does not support the theory of multiple intelligences:

The theory of multiple intelligences is sometimes cited as an example of pseudoscience because it lacks empirical evidence or falsifiability, though Gardner has argued otherwise.

Use in education 
Gardner defines an intelligence as "bio-psychological potential to process information that can be activated in a cultural setting to solve problems or create products that are of value in a culture." According to Gardner, there are more ways to do this than just through logical and linguistic intelligence. Gardner believes that the purpose of schooling "should be to develop intelligences and to help people reach vocational and avocational goals that are appropriate to their particular spectrum of intelligences. People who are helped to do so, [he] believe[s], feel more engaged and competent and therefore more inclined to serve society in a constructive way."

Gardner contends that IQ tests focus mostly on logical and linguistic intelligence. Upon doing well on these tests, the chances of attending a prestigious college or university increase, which in turn creates contributing members of society. While many students function well in this environment, there are those who do not. Gardner's theory argues that students will be better served by a broader vision of education, wherein teachers use different methodologies, exercises and activities to reach all students, not just those who excel at linguistic and logical intelligence. It challenges educators to find "ways that will work for this student learning this topic".

James Traub's article in The New Republic notes that Gardner's system has not been accepted by most academics in intelligence or teaching. Gardner states that "while Multiple Intelligences theory is consistent with much
empirical evidence, it has not been subjected to strong experimental tests ... Within the area of education, the applications of the theory are currently being examined in many projects. Our hunches will have to be revised many times in light of actual classroom experience."

Jerome Bruner agreed with Gardner that the intelligences were "useful fictions," and went on to state that "his approach is so far beyond the data-crunching of mental testers that it deserves to be cheered."

George Miller, a prominent cognitive psychologist, wrote in The New York Times Book Review that Gardner's argument consisted of "hunch and opinion" and Charles Murray and Richard J. Herrnstein in The Bell Curve (1994) called Gardner's theory "uniquely devoid of psychometric or other quantitative evidence."

In spite of its lack of general acceptance in the psychological community, Gardner's theory has been adopted by many schools, where it is often conflated with learning styles, and hundreds of books have been written about its applications in education. Some of the applications of Gardner's theory have been described as "simplistic" and Gardner himself has said he is "uneasy" with the way his theory has been used in schools. Gardner has denied that multiple intelligences are learning styles and agrees that the idea of learning styles is incoherent and lacking in empirical evidence. Gardner summarizes his approach with three recommendations for educators:  individualize the teaching style (to suit the most effective method for each student), pluralize the teaching (teach important materials in multiple ways), and avoid the term "styles" as being confusing.

See also

Notes

References

Bibliography

Further reading

External links 

 Multiple Intelligences Oasis, Howard Gardner's official website for MI Theory
 Multiple Intelligences, Future Minds and Educating The App Generation: A discussion with Dr Howard Gardner, Bridging the Gaps: A Portal for Curious Minds

Curricula
Education reform
Education theory
Intelligence by type
Life skills
Psychological theories